UTF-8 is a variable-length character encoding standard used for electronic communication. Defined by the Unicode Standard, the name is derived from Unicode (or Universal Coded Character Set) Transformation Format 8-bit.

UTF-8 is capable of encoding all 1,112,064 valid character code points in Unicode using one to four one-byte (8-bit) code units. Code points with lower numerical values, which tend to occur more frequently, are encoded using fewer bytes. It was designed for backward compatibility with ASCII: the first 128 characters of Unicode, which correspond one-to-one with ASCII, are encoded using a single byte with the same binary value as ASCII, so that valid ASCII text is valid UTF-8-encoded Unicode as well.

UTF-8 was designed as a superior alternative to UTF-1, a proposed variable-length encoding with partial ASCII compatibility which lacked some features including self-synchronization and fully ASCII-compatible handling of characters such as slashes. Ken Thompson and Rob Pike produced the first implementation for the Plan 9 operating system in September 1992.

UTF-8 results in fewer internationalization issues than any alternative text encoding, and it has been implemented in all modern operating systems, including Microsoft Windows, and standards such as JSON, where, as is increasingly the case, it is the only allowed form of Unicode.

UTF-8 is the dominant encoding for the World Wide Web (and internet technologies), accounting for 97.9% of all web pages, over 99.0% of the top 10,000 pages, and up to 100.0%  for many languages, . Virtually all countries and languages have 95.0% or more use of UTF-8 encodings on the web.

Naming 

The official name for the encoding is UTF-8, the spelling used in all Unicode Consortium documents. Most standards list it officially upper case like that, and all that do are also case-insensitive, and most commonly utf-8 is used in code (since easier to type). That is despite the official upper-casing being appropriate for an acronym.

Some other spellings may also be accepted by standards, e.g. web standards (which include CSS, HTML, XML, and HTTP headers) explicitly allow utf8 (and disallow "unicode") and many aliases for encodings). Spellings with a space e.g. "UTF 8" should not be used. The official Internet Assigned Numbers Authority also lists csUTF8 as the only alias, which is rarely used.

In Windows, UTF-8 is codepage 65001 (i.e. CP_UTF8 in source code).

In MySQL, UTF-8 is called utf8mb4 (with utf8mb3, and its alias utf8, being a subset encoding for characters in the Basic Multilingual Plane). In HP PCL, the Symbol-ID for UTF-8 is 18N.

In Oracle Database (since version 9.0), AL32UTF8 means UTF-8. See also CESU-8 for an almost synonym with UTF-8 that rarely should be used.

UTF-8-BOM and UTF-8-NOBOM are sometimes used for text files which contain or don't contain a byte order mark (BOM), respectively. In Japan especially, UTF-8 encoding without a BOM is sometimes called UTF-8N.

Encoding 

UTF-8 encodes code points in one to four bytes, depending on the value of the code point. In the following table, the  characters are replaced by the bits of the code point:

The first 128 code points (ASCII) need one byte. The next 1,920 code points need two bytes to encode, which covers the remainder of almost all Latin-script alphabets, and also IPA extensions, Greek, Cyrillic, Coptic, Armenian, Hebrew, Arabic, Syriac, Thaana and N'Ko alphabets, as well as Combining Diacritical Marks. Three bytes are needed for the rest of the Basic Multilingual Plane (BMP), which contains virtually all code points in common use, including most Chinese, Japanese and Korean characters. Four bytes are needed for code points in the other planes of Unicode, which include less common CJK characters, various historic scripts, mathematical symbols, and emoji (pictographic symbols).

A "character" can take more than 4 bytes because it is made of more than one code point. For instance a national flag character takes 8 bytes since it is "constructed from a pair of Unicode scalar values" both from outside the BMP.

Examples 
In these examples, red, green, and blue digits indicate how bits from the code point are distributed among the UTF-8 bytes. Additional bits added by the UTF-8 encoding process are shown in black.
 The Unicode code point for the euro sign € is U+20AC.
 As this code point lies between U+0800 and U+FFFF, this will take three bytes to encode.
 Hexadecimal  is binary . The two leading zeros are added because a three-byte encoding needs exactly sixteen bits from the code point.
 Because the encoding will be three bytes long, its leading byte starts with three 1s, then a 0
 The four most significant bits of the code point are stored in the remaining low order four bits of this byte, leaving 12 bits of the code point yet to be encoded.
 All continuation bytes contain exactly six bits from the code point.
 Finally the last six bits of the code point are stored in the low order six bits of the final byte, and again  is stored in the high order two bits.

The following table summarizes this conversion, as well as others with different lengths in UTF-8.

Octal 

UTF-8's use of six bits per byte to represent the actual characters being encoded means that octal notation (which uses 3-bit groups) can aid in the comparison of UTF-8 sequences with one another and in manual conversion.

With octal notation, the arbitrary octal digits, marked with x, y, z or w in the table, will remain unchanged when converting to or from UTF-8.

Codepage layout 

The following table summarizes usage of UTF-8 code units (individual bytes or octets) in a code page format. The upper half is for bytes used only in single-byte codes, so it looks like a normal code page; the lower half is for continuation bytes and leading bytes and is explained further in the legend below.

Overlong encodings 

In principle, it would be possible to inflate the number of bytes in an encoding by padding the code point with leading 0s. To encode the euro sign € from the above example in four bytes instead of three, it could be padded with leading 0s until it was 21 bits long
This is called an overlong encoding.

The standard specifies that the correct encoding of a code point uses only the minimum number of bytes required to hold the significant bits of the code point. Longer encodings are called overlong and are not valid UTF-8 representations of the code point. This rule maintains a one-to-one correspondence between code points and their valid encodings, so that there is a unique valid encoding for each code point. This ensures that string comparisons and searches are well-defined.

Invalid sequences and error handling 

Not all sequences of bytes are valid UTF-8. A UTF-8 decoder should be prepared for:

 invalid bytes
 an unexpected continuation byte
 a non-continuation byte before the end of the character
 the string ending before the end of the character (which can happen in simple string truncation)
 an overlong encoding
 a sequence that decodes to an invalid code point

Many of the first UTF-8 decoders would decode these, ignoring incorrect bits and accepting overlong results. Carefully crafted invalid UTF-8 could make them either skip or create ASCII characters such as NUL, slash, or quotes. Invalid UTF-8 has been used to bypass security validations in high-profile products including Microsoft's IIS web server and Apache's Tomcat servlet container.  states "Implementations of the decoding algorithm MUST protect against decoding invalid sequences." The Unicode Standard requires decoders to "...treat any ill-formed code unit sequence as an error condition. This guarantees that it will neither interpret nor emit an ill-formed code unit sequence."

Since RFC 3629 (November 2003), the high and low surrogate halves used by UTF-16 (U+D800 through U+DFFF) and code points not encodable by UTF-16 (those after U+10FFFF) are not legal Unicode values, and their UTF-8 encoding must be treated as an invalid byte sequence. Not decoding unpaired surrogate halves makes it impossible to store invalid UTF-16 (such as Windows filenames or UTF-16 that has been split between the surrogates) as UTF-8, while it is possible with WTF-8.

Some implementations of decoders throw exceptions on errors. This has the disadvantage that it can turn what would otherwise be harmless errors (such as a "no such file" error) into a denial of service. For instance early versions of Python 3.0 would exit immediately if the command line or environment variables contained invalid UTF-8. An alternative practice is to replace errors with a replacement character. Since Unicode 6 (October 2010), the standard has recommended a "best practice" where the error ends as soon as a disallowed byte is encountered. In these decoders  is two errors (2 bytes in the first one). This means an error is no more than three bytes long and never contains the start of a valid character, and there are 21,952 different possible errors. The standard also recommends replacing each error with the replacement character "�" (U+FFFD).

Byte order mark 

The Unicode Standard neither requires nor recommends the use of the BOM for UTF-8, but warns that it may be encountered at the start of a file trans-coded from another encoding. While ASCII text encoded using UTF-8 is backward compatible with ASCII, this is not true when Unicode Standard recommendations are ignored and a BOM is added. A BOM can confuse software that isn't prepared for it but can otherwise accept UTF-8, e.g. programming languages that permit non-ASCII bytes in string literals but not at the start of the file. Nevertheless, there was and still is software that always inserts a BOM when writing UTF-8, and refuses to correctly interpret UTF-8 unless the first character is a BOM (or the file only contains ASCII).

Adoption 

Most operating systems, including Windows, support UTF-8.

Many standards only support UTF-8, e.g. JSON exchange requires it (without a byte order mark (BOM)). UTF-8 is also the recommendation from the WHATWG for HTML and DOM specifications, and stating "UTF-8 encoding is the most appropriate encoding for interchange of Unicode" and the Internet Mail Consortium recommends that all e‑mail programs be able to display and create mail using UTF-8. The World Wide Web Consortium recommends UTF-8 as the default encoding in XML and HTML (and not just using UTF-8, also declaring it in metadata), "even when all characters are in the ASCII range ...  Using non-UTF-8 encodings can have unexpected results".

UTF-8 has been the most common encoding for the World Wide Web since 2008. , UTF-8 accounts for on average 97.9% (previously up to 98.0%) of all web pages (and 99.1% of top 10,000 pages and 98.6% of the top 1,000 highest ranked web pages. Although many pages only use ASCII characters to display content, few websites now declare their encoding to only be ASCII instead of UTF-8. Over 45% of the languages tracked have 100% UTF-8 use.

Lots of software has the ability to read/write UTF-8, and sometimes (even in some Microsoft products) UTF-8 is the only option. It may though require the user to change options from the normal settings, or may require a BOM (byte order mark) as the first character to read the file. Examples of software supporting UTF-8 include Microsoft Word, Microsoft Excel (2016 and later), Google Drive and LibreOffice. Most databases can read and write UTF-8.

However for local text files UTF-8 usage is less prevalent, where a few legacy single-byte (and a few CJK multi-byte) encodings remain in use to some degree. The primary cause for this is text editors that refuse to use UTF-8 when processing files, unless the first bytes of the file encode a byte order mark character (BOM). Many other text editors simply assume a UTF-8 encoding for all files due to its nigh-ubiquity. Since Windows 10 Windows Notepad defaults to writing UTF-8 without a BOM (a change since ), bringing it into line with most other text editors. Some system files on Windows 11 require UTF-8 with no requirement for a BOM, and almost all files on macOS and Linux are required to be UTF-8 without a BOM. Java 18 defaults to reading and writing files as UTF-8, and in older versions (e.g. LTS versions) only the NIO API was changed to do so. Many other programming languages default to UTF-8 for I/O, including Ruby 3.0 and R 4.2.2. All currently supported versions of Python support UTF-8 for I/O, even on Windows (where it is opt-in for the open() function), and plans exist to make UTF-8 I/O the default in Python 3.15 on all platforms.

Usage of UTF-8 within software is also lower than in other areas (UTF-16 is often used instead). This occurs particularly in Windows, but also in JavaScript, Python, Qt, and many other cross-platform software libraries. Compatibility with the Windows API is the primary reason for this, though the belief that direct indexing of the BMP improves speed was also a factor. More recent software has started to use UTF-8 almost exclusively: The default string primitive in Go, Julia, Rust, Swift 5, and PyPy uses UTF-8; a future version of Python is planned to store strings as UTF-8; and modern versions of Microsoft Visual Studio use UTF-8 internally. Microsoft's SQL Server 2019 added support for UTF-8, and using it results in a 35% speed increase, and "nearly 50% reduction in storage requirements." UTF-8 is the "only text encoding mandated to be supported by the C++ standard" in C++20. C++23 adopts UTF-8 as the only portable source code file format (surprisingly there was none before).

All currently supported Windows versions support UTF-8 in some way (including Xbox); partial support has existed since at least Windows XP. , Microsoft has reversed its previous position of only recommending UTF-16; the capability to set UTF-8 as the "code page" for the Windows API was introduced; and  Microsoft recommends programmers use UTF-8, and even states "UTF-16 [..] is a unique burden that Windows places on code that targets multiple platforms."

History 

The International Organization for Standardization (ISO) set out to compose a universal multi-byte character set in 1989. The draft ISO 10646 standard contained a non-required annex called UTF-1 that provided a byte stream encoding of its 32-bit code points. This encoding was not satisfactory on performance grounds, among other problems, and the biggest problem was probably that it did not have a clear separation between ASCII and non-ASCII: new UTF-1 tools would be backward compatible with ASCII-encoded text, but UTF-1-encoded text could confuse existing code expecting ASCII (or extended ASCII), because it could contain continuation bytes in the range 0x21–0x7E that meant something else in ASCII, e.g., 0x2F for '/', the Unix path directory separator, and this example is reflected in the name and introductory text of its replacement. The table below was derived from a textual description in the annex.

In July 1992, the X/Open committee XoJIG was looking for a better encoding. Dave Prosser of Unix System Laboratories submitted a proposal for one that had faster implementation characteristics and introduced the improvement that 7-bit ASCII characters would only represent themselves; all multi-byte sequences would include only bytes where the high bit was set. The name File System Safe UCS Transformation Format (FSS-UTF) and most of the text of this proposal were later preserved in the final specification.

FSS-UTF 

In August 1992, this proposal was circulated by an IBM X/Open representative to interested parties. A modification by Ken Thompson of the Plan 9 operating system group at Bell Labs made it self-synchronizing, letting a reader start anywhere and immediately detect character boundaries, at the cost of being somewhat less bit-efficient than the previous proposal. It also abandoned the use of biases and instead added the rule that only the shortest possible encoding is allowed; the additional loss in compactness is relatively insignificant, but readers now have to look out for invalid encodings to avoid reliability and especially security issues. Thompson's design was outlined on September 2, 1992, on a placemat in a New Jersey diner with Rob Pike. In the following days, Pike and Thompson implemented it and updated Plan 9 to use it throughout, and then communicated their success back to X/Open, which accepted it as the specification for FSS-UTF.

UTF-8 was first officially presented at the USENIX conference in San Diego, from January 25 to 29, 1993. The Internet Engineering Task Force adopted UTF-8 in its Policy on Character Sets and Languages in RFC 2277 (BCP 18) for future internet standards work, replacing Single Byte Character Sets such as Latin-1 in older RFCs.

Standards 

There are several current definitions of UTF-8 in various standards documents:

  / STD 63 (2003), which establishes UTF-8 as a standard internet protocol element
  defines UTF-8 NFC for Network Interchange (2008)
 ISO/IEC 10646:2014 §9.1 (2014)
 The Unicode Standard, Version 14.0.0 (2021)

They supersede the definitions given in the following obsolete works:

 The Unicode Standard, Version 2.0, Appendix A (1996)
 ISO/IEC 10646-1:1993 Amendment 2 / Annex R (1996)
  (1996)
  (1998)
 The Unicode Standard, Version 3.0, §2.3 (2000) plus Corrigendum #1 : UTF-8 Shortest Form (2000)
 Unicode Standard Annex #27: Unicode 3.1 (2001)
 The Unicode Standard, Version 5.0 (2006)
 The Unicode Standard, Version 6.0 (2010)

They are all the same in their general mechanics, with the main differences being on issues such as allowed range of code point values and safe handling of invalid input.

Comparison with other encodings 

Some of the important features of this encoding are as follows:

 Backward compatibility: Backward compatibility with ASCII and the enormous amount of software designed to process ASCII-encoded text was the main driving force behind the design of UTF-8. In UTF-8, single bytes with values in the range of 0 to 127 map directly to Unicode code points in the ASCII range. Single bytes in this range represent characters, as they do in ASCII. Moreover, 7-bit bytes (bytes where the most significant bit is 0) never appear in a multi-byte sequence, and no valid multi-byte sequence decodes to an ASCII code-point. A sequence of 7-bit bytes is both valid ASCII and valid UTF-8, and under either interpretation represents the same sequence of characters. Therefore, the 7-bit bytes in a UTF-8 stream represent all and only the ASCII characters in the stream. Thus, many text processors, parsers, protocols, file formats, text display programs, etc., which use ASCII characters for formatting and control purposes, will continue to work as intended by treating the UTF-8 byte stream as a sequence of single-byte characters, without decoding the multi-byte sequences. ASCII characters on which the processing turns, such as punctuation, whitespace, and control characters will never be encoded as multi-byte sequences. It is therefore safe for such processors to simply ignore or pass-through the multi-byte sequences, without decoding them. For example, ASCII whitespace may be used to tokenize a UTF-8 stream into words; ASCII line-feeds may be used to split a UTF-8 stream into lines; and ASCII NUL characters can be used to split UTF-8-encoded data into null-terminated strings. Similarly, many format strings used by library functions like "printf" will correctly handle UTF-8-encoded input arguments.
 Fallback and auto-detection: Only a small subset of possible byte strings are a valid UTF-8 string: several bytes cannot appear; a byte with the high bit set cannot be alone; and further requirements mean that it is extremely unlikely that a readable text in any extended ASCII is valid UTF-8. Part of the popularity of UTF-8 is due to it providing a form of backward compatibility for these as well. A UTF-8 processor which erroneously receives extended ASCII as input can thus "auto-detect" this with very high reliability. A UTF-8 stream may simply contain errors, resulting in the auto-detection scheme producing false positives; but auto-detection is successful in the vast majority of cases, especially with longer texts, and is widely used. It also works to "fall back" or replace 8-bit bytes using the appropriate code-point for a legacy encoding when errors in the UTF-8 are detected, allowing recovery even if UTF-8 and legacy encoding is concatenated in the same file.
 Prefix code: The first byte indicates the number of bytes in the sequence. Reading from a stream can instantaneously decode each individual fully received sequence, without first having to wait for either the first byte of a next sequence or an end-of-stream indication. The length of multi-byte sequences is easily determined by humans as it is simply the number of high-order 1s in the leading byte. An incorrect character will not be decoded if a stream ends mid-sequence.
This means a search will not accidentally find the sequence for one character starting in the middle of another character. It also means the start of a character can be found from a random position by backing up at most 3 bytes to find the leading byte. An incorrect character will not be decoded if a stream starts mid-sequence, and a shorter sequence will never appear inside a longer one.
 Sorting order: The chosen values of the leading bytes means that a list of UTF-8 strings can be sorted in code point order by sorting the corresponding byte sequences.

Single-byte 

 UTF-8 can encode any Unicode character, avoiding the need to figure out and set a "code page" or otherwise indicate what character set is in use, and allowing output in multiple scripts at the same time. For many scripts there have been more than one single-byte encoding in usage, so even knowing the script was insufficient information to display it correctly.
 The bytes 0xFE and 0xFF do not appear, so a valid UTF-8 stream never matches the UTF-16 byte order mark and thus cannot be confused with it. The absence of 0xFF (0377) also eliminates the need to escape this byte in Telnet (and FTP control connection).
 UTF-8 encoded text is larger than specialized single-byte encodings except for plain ASCII characters. In the case of scripts which used 8-bit character sets with non-Latin characters encoded in the upper half (such as most Cyrillic and Greek alphabet code pages), characters in UTF-8 will be double the size. For some scripts, such as Thai and Devanagari (which is used by various South Asian languages), characters will triple in size. There are even examples where a single byte turns into a composite character in Unicode and is thus six times larger in UTF-8. This has caused objections in India and other countries.
 It is possible in UTF-8 (or any other multi-byte encoding) to split or truncate a string in the middle of a character. If the two pieces are not re-appended later before interpretation as characters, this can introduce an invalid sequence at both the end of the previous section and the start of the next, and some decoders will not preserve these bytes and result in data loss. Because UTF-8 is self-synchronizing this will however never introduce a different valid character, and it is also fairly easy to move the truncation point backward to the start of a character.
 If the code points are all the same size, measurements of a fixed number of them is easy. Due to ASCII-era documentation where "character" is used as a synonym for "byte" this is often considered important. However, by measuring string positions using bytes instead of "characters" most algorithms can be easily and efficiently adapted for UTF-8. Searching for a string within a long string can for example be done byte by byte; the self-synchronization property prevents false positives.

Other multi-byte 

 UTF-8 can encode any Unicode character. Files in different scripts can be displayed correctly without having to choose the correct code page or font. For instance, Chinese and Arabic can be written in the same file without specialized markup or manual settings that specify an encoding.
 UTF-8 is self-synchronizing: character boundaries are easily identified by scanning for well-defined bit patterns in either direction. If bytes are lost due to error or corruption, one can always locate the next valid character and resume processing. If there is a need to shorten a string to fit a specified field, the previous valid character can easily be found. This also means that byte-oriented string-searching algorithms can be used with UTF-8 (as a character is the same as a "word" made up of that many bytes), optimized versions of byte searches can be much faster due to hardware support and lookup tables that have only 256 entries. Self-synchronization does however require that bits be reserved for these markers in every byte, increasing the size.
 Efficient to encode using simple bitwise operations. UTF-8 does not require slower mathematical operations such as multiplication or division (unlike ,  and other encodings).
 UTF-8 will take more space than a multi-byte encoding designed for a specific script. East Asian legacy encodings generally used two bytes per character yet take three bytes per character in UTF-8.

UTF-16 

 Byte encodings and UTF-8 are represented by byte arrays in programs, and often nothing needs to be done to a function when converting source code from a byte encoding to UTF-8. UTF-16 is represented by 16-bit word arrays, and converting to UTF-16 while maintaining compatibility with existing ASCII-based programs (such as was done with Windows) requires every API and data structure that takes a string to be duplicated, one version accepting byte strings and another version accepting UTF-16. If backward compatibility is not needed, all string handling still must be modified.
 Text encoded in UTF-8 will be smaller than the same text encoded in UTF-16 if there are more code points below U+0080 than in the range U+0800..U+FFFF. This is true for all modern European languages. It is often true even for languages like Chinese, due to the large number of spaces, newlines, digits, and HTML markup in typical files.
 Most communication (e.g. HTML and IP) and storage (e.g. for Unix) was designed for a stream of bytes. A UTF-16 string must use a pair of bytes for each code unit:
 The order of those two bytes becomes an issue and must be specified in the UTF-16 protocol, such as with a byte order mark.
 If an odd number of bytes is missing from UTF-16, the whole rest of the string will be meaningless text. Any bytes missing from UTF-8 will still allow the text to be recovered accurately starting with the next character after the missing bytes.

Derivatives 
The following implementations show slight differences from the UTF-8 specification. They are incompatible with the UTF-8 specification and may be rejected by conforming UTF-8 applications.

CESU-8 

Unicode Technical Report #26 assigns the name CESU-8 to a nonstandard variant of UTF-8, in which Unicode characters in supplementary planes are encoded using six bytes, rather than the four bytes required by UTF-8. CESU-8 encoding treats each half of a four-byte UTF-16 surrogate pair as a two-byte UCS-2 character, yielding two three-byte UTF-8 characters, which together represent the original supplementary character. Unicode characters within the Basic Multilingual Plane appear as they would normally in UTF-8. The Report was written to acknowledge and formalize the existence of data encoded as CESU-8, despite the Unicode Consortium discouraging its use, and notes that a possible intentional reason for CESU-8 encoding is preservation of UTF-16 binary collation.

CESU-8 encoding can result from converting UTF-16 data with supplementary characters to UTF-8, using conversion methods that assume UCS-2 data, meaning they are unaware of four-byte UTF-16 supplementary characters. It is primarily an issue on operating systems which extensively use UTF-16 internally, such as Microsoft Windows.

In Oracle Database, the  character set uses CESU-8 encoding, and is deprecated. The  character set uses standards-compliant UTF-8 encoding, and is preferred.

CESU-8 is prohibited for use in HTML5 documents.

MySQL utf8mb3 

In MySQL, the  character set is defined to be UTF-8 encoded data with a maximum of three bytes per character, meaning only Unicode characters in the Basic Multilingual Plane (i.e. from UCS-2) are supported.

Modified UTF-8 

Modified UTF-8 (MUTF-8) originated in the Java programming language. Modified UTF-8 strings never contain any actual null bytes but can contain all Unicode code points including U+0000, which allows such strings (with a null byte appended) to be processed by traditional null-terminated string functions. All known Modified UTF-8 implementations also treat the surrogate pairs as in CESU-8.

The dex format defined by Dalvik also uses the same modified UTF-8 to represent string values. Tcl also uses the same modified UTF-8 as Java for internal representation of Unicode data, but uses strict CESU-8 for external data.

WTF-8 

In WTF-8 (Wobbly Transformation Format, 8-bit) unpaired surrogate halves (U+D800 through U+DFFF) are allowed. This is necessary to store possibly-invalid UTF-16, such as Windows filenames. Many systems that deal with UTF-8 work this way without considering it a different encoding, as it is simpler.

The term "WTF-8" has also been used humorously to refer to erroneously doubly-encoded UTF-8 sometimes with the implication that CP1252 bytes are the only ones encoded.

PEP 383 

Version 3 of the Python programming language treats each byte of an invalid UTF-8 bytestream as an error (see also changes with new UTF-8 mode in Python 3.7); this gives 128 different possible errors. Extensions have been created to allow any byte sequence that is assumed to be UTF-8 to be losslessly transformed to UTF-16 or UTF-32, by translating the 128 possible error bytes to reserved code points, and transforming those code points back to error bytes to output UTF-8. The most common approach is to translate the codes to U+DC80...U+DCFF which are low (trailing) surrogate values and thus "invalid" UTF-16, as used by Python's PEP 383 (or "surrogateescape") approach. Another encoding called MirBSD OPTU-8/16 converts them to U+EF80...U+EFFF in a Private Use Area. In either approach, the byte value is encoded in the low eight bits of the output code point.

These encodings are very useful because they avoid the need to deal with "invalid" byte strings until much later, if at all, and allow "text" and "data" byte arrays to be the same object. If a program wants to use UTF-16 internally these are required to preserve and use filenames that can use invalid UTF-8; as the Windows filesystem API uses UTF-16, the need to support invalid UTF-8 is less there.

For the encoding to be reversible, the standard UTF-8 encodings of the code points used for erroneous bytes must be considered invalid. This makes the encoding incompatible with WTF-8 or CESU-8 (though only for 128 code points). When re-encoding it is necessary to be careful of sequences of error code points which convert back to valid UTF-8, which may be used by malicious software to get unexpected characters in the output, though this cannot produce ASCII characters so it is considered comparatively safe, since malicious sequences (such as cross-site scripting) usually rely on ASCII characters.

See also 

 Alt code
 
 Comparison of Unicode encodings
 GB 18030, a Chinese encoding, though fully supporting Unicode
 UTF-EBCDIC, a rarely used encoding, even for mainframes it was made for
 Iconv
 
 Specials (Unicode block)
 Unicode and email
 Unicode and HTML
 Character encodings in HTML

Notes

References

External links 

 Original UTF-8 paper (or pdf) for Plan 9 from Bell Labs
 History of UTF-8 by Rob Pike
 UTF-8 test pages:
 Andreas Prilop 
 Jost Gippert
 World Wide Web Consortium
 Unix/Linux: UTF-8/Unicode FAQ, Linux Unicode HOWTO, UTF-8 and Gentoo
 

Character encoding
Computer-related introductions in 1993
Encodings
Unicode Transformation Formats